Larry Mason may refer to:
 Larry Mason (American football)
 Larry Mason (speed skater)
 M.L. Mason, known as Larry, justice of the Iowa Supreme Court